This list of bus routes in Metro Manila includes all commercially operated local bus routes in the Philippine capital region and surrounding area, as well as the contracted express bus service operated under the Premium Point-to-Point Bus Service branding. Bus services in Metro Manila are regulated by the Department of Transportation in partnership with the Metropolitan Manila Development Authority and operated by private bus operators, individually licensed by the Land Transportation Franchising and Regulatory Board. As of August 2020, of the more than 300 public transport routes available in Metro Manila, there are 64 routes being serviced by public utility buses in the metropolitan region.

Routes

Local service

All local or city bus services in Metro Manila are contracted out to private firms. Prior to the 2020 Philippine coronavirus lockdowns, the region had more than 900 public transport routes operated by 830 bus franchises and more than 43,000 jeepney franchises competing with each other. This extremely deregulated public transport environment has made managing public transport services a challenge for the government for many years. The oversupply of public utility vehicles as well as redundant and overlapping transport routes have also led to severe road congestions.

In June 2020, the Department of Transportation launched the Metro Manila Bus Rationalization Program in a complete overhaul of Manila's bus transport network. The program was a follow through of the 2017 Public Utility Vehicle Modernization Program and coincided with the government's gradual and calibrated resumption of Manila's public transport following more than two months under coronavirus restrictions.

On July 1, the EDSA Carousel line (Route E) started its interim operations with a total of fifteen stops in dedicated bus lanes completed by the Metropolitan Manila Development Authority. On August 17, 2020, the Land Transportation Franchising and Regulatory Board added four more city bus routes.

Due to the further easing of COVID-19 pandemic restrictions, the LTFRB noted that the rationalized bus routes were "not responsive to the existing demand of passengers". Furthermore, in anticipation of increased passenger volume due to the return of full onsite classes and onsite work, the LTFRB announced through LTFRB Memorandum Circular No. 67 series of 2022 on August 19, 2022 the reopening of many pre-pandemic route franchises for public buses, jeepneys, and the UV Express. Based on this, the 39 existing bus routes under the rationalized bus routes program were modified to include 32 pre-pandemic bus routes and retain rationalized bus routes that "were found to be responsive to passenger demand". On September 29, 2022, an additional 20 bus route franchises were also approved through LTFRB Memorandum Circular No. 74 series of 2022.

Express service

Launched in March 2015, the Premium Point-to-Point (P2P) Bus Service, formerly known as Express Connect, is an express bus service connecting the suburbs to the central business districts and the international gateways. It initially operated between Quezon City and Makati, with a third route to SM Mall of Asia in Pasay. By December 2015, a total of twenty buses from Froehlich Tours and HM Transport serviced the routes linking Trinoma and SM North EDSA in Quezon City with SM Megamall in Mandaluyong and Makati, with only one or two stops in between. 

A third P2P service was introduced in April 2016 connecting Greenbelt in Makati and Alabang Town Center in Muntinlupa operated by RRCG Transport.

Current routes

Quezon City Bus Service

In 2021, under the Quezon City Bus Augmentation Program, the Quezon City government began operating eight city-wide bus routes with the approval of the Land Transportation and Franchising Regulatory Board. The service is also referred to as City Bus and the QCity Bus Service. On June 24, 2022, Quezon City mayor Joy Belmonte announced that the city's bus services will continue to be offered for free amidst the return of onsite work and classes and high fuel prices.

As of March 2022, over 5.3 million passengers have been served by the city's bus services.

Routes

See also
 Transportation in Metro Manila

Notes

References

Routes
Manila
Bus routes